Alinci is a village in the Municipality of Prilep, North Macedonia.

Geography 

Alinci is located roughly 13 kilometres south-west from Prilep.

History 
In the 19th century, Alinci was a Macedonian village in the Prilep region of the Ottoman Empire.
According to the statistics of Vasil Kanchov's book Macedonia: Ethnography And Statistics published in 1900, Alinci had a population of 102 people, all Macedonian Christians.

At the outbreak of the Balkan Wars, a person from Alinci served in the Macedonian-Adrianopolitan Volunteer Corps.

On 6 November 1914, following the Battle of Prilep, the Turkish V Corps of the Vardar Army retreated through Alinci to Bitola.

Demographics 

According to the 2002 census, there were 238 people living in the village, all Macedonians.

The Church of the Resurrection of Christ is located in Alinci.

References

Villages in Prilep Municipality